Evgenavis (named after the Russian paleontologist Evgeny Kurochkin) is a genus of extinct basal bird that lived from the Barremian to the Aptian. The type specimen ZIN PH 1/154 is an isolated tarsometatarsus found in the Ilek Formation (Shestakovo locality), Western Siberia. Evgenavis may have been the only confuciusornithiform known outside the Jehol Biota, although there is also the possibility that it could have been a different type of avialan, such as an enantiornithean or a relative of Vorona. A cladogram within a 2019 study involving a wide range of theropods included Evgenavis as a longipterygid.

References

Confuciusornithids
Longipterygids
Early Cretaceous birds of Asia
Fossil taxa described in 2014